Psyllobora renifer is a species of lady beetle in the family Coccinellidae. It is found in Central America and North America.

References

Further reading

External links

 

Coccinellidae
Articles created by Qbugbot
Beetles described in 1899